Licania hedbergii is a species of plant in the family Chrysobalanaceae. It is endemic to Ecuador.  Its natural habitat is subtropical or tropical moist montane forests.

This tree was found in 1990 by Walter Palacios near the road to Nueva Loja (also known as Lago Agrio). It may also be present in the Cayambe Coca Ecological Reserve and Sumaco Napo-Galeras National Park. It is primarily threatened by deforestation.

References

Endemic flora of Ecuador
hedbergii
Vulnerable plants
Taxonomy articles created by Polbot
Taxobox binomials not recognized by IUCN